Chlorosea banksaria, or Bank's emerald moth, is a species of emerald moth in the family Geometridae. It is found in North America.

The MONA or Hodges number for Chlorosea banksaria is 7013.

Subspecies
These two subspecies belong to the species Chlorosea banksaria:
 Chlorosea banksaria banksaria
 Chlorosea banksaria gracearia Sperry, 1969

References

Further reading

External links

 

Geometrinae
Articles created by Qbugbot
Moths described in 1944